Centaurodendron dracaenoides is a species of flowering plant in the family Asteraceae. It is found only in Chile. It is threatened by habitat loss.

References

dracaenoides
Flora of Chile
Critically endangered plants
Taxonomy articles created by Polbot